van der Cammen is a Dutch surname. Notable people with the surname include:

Ellen van der Cammen (born 1977), Dutch curler
Steven van der Cammen (born 1980), Dutch curler, brother of Ellen

Dutch-language surnames